A Golden Globe Award is an award presented  by the Hollywood Foreign Press Association to recognize excellence in film and television.

Golden Globe can also mean:
Golden Globes (Portugal), an award presented by SIC-TV in Portugal to recognize excellence in art and entertainment in that country
Globo d'oro, an Italian annual film award
Sunday Times Golden Globe Race, a non-stop, single-handed, round-the-world yacht race, held in 1968–1969
2018 Golden Globe Race, a series of round-the-world yacht races held as a revival of the Sunday Times Race
The Golden Globe, a 1988 science fiction novel by John Varley